The Second cabinet of Louis Napoleon was formed by President Louis-Napoleon Bonaparte on 22 January 1852, replacing the interim First cabinet of Louis Napoleon. It remained in place until the proclamation of the Second French Empire on 2 December 1852, when it was replaced by the Third cabinet of Napoleon III.

References

French governments
1852 establishments in France
1852 disestablishments in France
Cabinets established in 1852
Cabinets disestablished in 1852
Napoleon III